The American Association of Insurance Services (AAIS) is a national insurance advisory organization in the United States.

Among other things, is one of the two major "rating bureaus" in the United States, along with the  Insurance Services Office. Rating bureaus publish standardized insurance policy forms and prices that insurance company customers use in their business. This expedites compliance and allows the policyholder customers to compare policy forms more easily. Companies which do not use the standardized form exactly will often use it as a base with subtle modifications.

It was founded in the 1930s as the Chicago-based Transportation Insurance Rating Bureau focused exclusively on inland marine insurance. In 1975 its name was changed and scope was broadened to include all insurance products.

Background
In 1936, AAIS was formerly known as Travel Insurance Rating Bureau, founded as a non-profit trade organization. Its company practices focused primarily on tariff and regulatory declarations concerning travel insurance risks. The activities of the Association slowly expanded to involve all threats of property. In 1975, the name was changed into American Association of Insurance Services. In 1984, it was incorporated in Delaware as 501(c)(6) non-profit organization.

The American Association of Insurance Services (AAIS) provides insurance policy forms and the risk history assessment details provided by property and casualty insurance firms. AAIS offers details on product creation, statistical research, compliance, administrative paperwork and technical preparation to more than 700 insurance agencies.

In 2009, AAIS organized an annual conference held in Half Moon Bay, California, and Jack M. Rader was appointed as the new chairman. He succeeded James w. Sullivan. 

In 2012, Edmund J. Kelly was appointed President and CEO.

References

External links 
 AAIS website

Actuarial firms
American companies established in 1975
Financial services companies established in 1975
Insurance companies of the United States
Lisle, Illinois
Companies based in Chicago